Padma Talwalkar (born 28 February 1949) is an Indian classical vocalist.

Early life
Padma Talwalkar was born in Pune, India. She received training in Khyal gayaki in three main styles or gharanas: Gwalior, Kirana and Jaipur. Her love for the accuracy and sanctity of notes she attributes to her first Guru, Pt. Pimpalkhare of the Kirana Gharana, and the latter to her training under the late Smt. Mogubai Kurdikar of the Jaipur Gharana. From Pandit Gajananrao Joshi she imbibed elements of the forceful and majestic Gwalior-Agra-Jaipur Gharana. She also gratefully acknowledges her musical debt to Smt. Kishori Amonkar whose musical influences remain with her even today.

Personal life
Padma Talwalkar is married to well known tabla maestro Pt. Suresh Talwalkar. Their son Satyajit Talwalkar and daughter Savani Talwalkar are also tabla players.

Noted disciples 
Padma Talwalkar's notable disciples include Gauri Pathare, Shalmalee Joshi, Saylee Talwalkar, Yashaswi Sirpotdar, Rasika Vartak, Ankita Deole, among many others.

Awards and fellowships
 Five year scholarship from the Bhulabhai Memorial Trust
 Two year fellowship from the National Centre for the Performing Arts (India) NCPA, Mumbai.
 Pandit Jasraj Gaurav Puraskar in 2004.
 Smt.Vatsalabai Bhimsen Joshi award in 2009.
Rajhans Pratishthan Puraskar in 2010.
Sangeet Natak Academy Award in 2016.

Other notable works 

 Her albums – 'Flights of Melody', 'Healing Mantras', 'Bandish' series – have gained wide recognition in the country as well as abroad.
 Padmatai has emerged as a major presence in the community of performing artists.
 She is a recognized All India Radio and Doordarshan artiste.
 She has performed at all major music concerts in India, such as Doverlane Music Conference Kolkata, Sawai Gandharva Mahotsav Pune, Tansen Sangeet Samaroh Gwalior, and Elephanta Festival, Mumbai.

References

Hindustani singers
Living people
1949 births
Singers from Pune
Indian women classical singers
Women Hindustani musicians
20th-century Indian singers
Women musicians from Maharashtra
20th-century Indian women singers